Pakubuwono I (also as Pakubuwana I, before his reign was known as Pangeran Puger), uncle of Amangkurat III of Mataram was a combatant for the succession of the Mataram dynasty, both as a co-belligerent during the Trunajaya rebellion (from 1677 to 1681), and during the First Javanese War of Succession (1703–1707).
 
He created a new name to his line, with the title Pakubuwono, the standard name for rulers of the subsequently created Surakarta. Most Javanese chronicles depicts him as a great wise ruler. He ruled from 1705 to 1719.
 
His son succeeded him with the title Amangkurat IV.

Origin 
Born as Raden Mas Darajat, he was the son of Amangkurat I, the last Mataram ruler based in Plered, from his second queen consort, Ratu Wetan. Ratu Wetan originated from Kajoran family, descended from Sultans of Pajang. 
 
RM. Darajat was once appointed as a crown prince when a conflict between his father and Raden Mas Rahmat (later Amangkurat II of Mataram) occurred. RM. Rahmat was Prince Puger's half-brother, born from Ratu Kulon (the first queen consort of Amangkurat I). Amangkurat I relinquished crown prince title from RM. Rahmat and ceded it to RM. Darajat. But, when Kajoran family was proven to support Trunajaya rebellion in 1674, Amangkurat I was forced to draw the title from RM. Darajat.

Defending Plered 
The peak of Trunajaya rebellion took place in 1677. This Madurese prince made a great invasion to Plered, capital of Mataram. Amangkurat I escaped to the west and assigned RM. Rahmat to defend the palace. But, RM. Rahmat refused and chose to evacuate as well. Prince Puger appeared to replace his half-brother to prove to his father that not all of Kajoran family members were involved in Trunajaya rebellion.
 
When Trunajaya troops came to Plered Palace, Amangkurat I had evacuated. Prince Puger stood against them. But, the enemy's strength was too great, so he was forced to escaped to Jenar village (now in Purwodadi, Purworejo).  Prince Puger built a new palace namely Purwakanda there, and appointed himself as a king styled Susuhunan Ingalaga.
 
Trunajaya plundered Mataram heirlooms. He subsequently moved to his post in Kediri. Meanwhile, Sunan Ingalaga came back to Plered to destroy the remaining Trunajaya's followers placed there. Sunan Ingalaga then appointed himself as a new Mataram ruler.

Defeated by Amangkurat II 
In the meantime, Amangkurat I had died while escaping to Tegal. RM. Rahmat was appointed as a new ruler of Mataram, styled Amangkurat II. As his father's will, Amangkurat II requested Dutch East India Company for help. Trunajaya rebellion was eventually suppressed in the end of 1679.
 
Amangkurat II was a king without palace because Plered had been occupied by Sunan Ingalaga, his own half-brother. He built new palace in Wanakerta forest, later renamed to Kartasura, in September 1680. Amangkurat II then summoned Sunan Ingalaga to join with him, but Sunan Ingalaga turned it down.
 
The refusal caused a civil war. Eventually, on 28 November 1681 Sunan Ingalaga surrendered to Jacob Couper, a Dutch officer who helped Amangkurat II. Sunan Ingalaga himself was titled Prince Puger again and recognized his half-brother's rule Amangkurat II.
 
The defeat of Prince Puger marked the end of Mataram Sultanate which became vassal of Sunanate of Surakarta. Despite of that, Javanese chronicles still praise Prince Puger's existence as an ordinary man in Kartasura. The king was indeed Amangkurat II, but the government of sunanate was controlled by Prince Puger. It is understandable because the Javanese chronicles were written in the era of Prince Puger-descended rulers.

Death of Captain Tack 
Amangkurat II was successfully ascended to throne because of Dutch assistance, but accompanied by treaty that worsened Kartasura-based Mataram Sultanate. When the situation was conducive, the anti-Dutch Patih Nerangkusuma persuaded him to betray the treaty.
 
In 1685, Amangkurat II protected Dutch fugitive namely Untung Suropati. Captain François Tack arrived in Kartasura to arrest him. Amangkurat II pretended to help Dutch East India Company. But, he secretly tasked Prince Puger to be disguised as Untung Suropati's follower.
 
In a bitter fight taken place around Kartasura Palace in February 1686, the 75-man Dutch troops are killed by Untung Surapati's troops, including Captain Tack who was unable to go down from his horse.

Expelled from Kartasura 
Amangkurat II died in 1703, and succeeded by his son Amangkurat III, a king disliked by many people due to his bad attitude, so there were many supports for Prince Puger came. The relation between uncle and nephew strained. Amangkurat III's hostility toward his half-uncle severed when Raden Suryokusumo, son of Prince Puger, rebelled.
 
The hostility culminated in May 1704, when Amangkurat III sent troops to exterminate Prince Puger's family. But, he and his followers successfully escaped. The one tasked to chase was Duke Jangrana II, Regent of Surabaya. But Duke Jangrana II secretly supported Prince Puger, so his pursuing was no more than a drama.
 
Rangga Yudanegara, Regent of Semarang, acted as a mediator of Prince Puger in requesting Dutch East India Company for help. Yudanegara's diplomacy skill successfully made Dutch East India Company forgiving Captain Tack's death. They were prepared to help Prince Puger's struggle with some conditions beneficial to them.
 
The content of Semarang Treaty which had to be signed by Prince Puger is, among others, the transfer of Eastern Madura to Dutch East India Company.

Kartasura occupation 
On 6 July 1704, Prince Puger was appointed as a ruler styled Susuhunan Paku Buwana Senapati Ingalaga Ngabdurahman Sayidin Panatagama Khalifatulah Tanah Jawa, commonly abbreviated as Pakubuwana or Pakubuwono I.

One year later, Pakubuwono I, guarded by joint Dutch, Semarang, Western Madura, and Surabaya troops, moved to invade Kartasura. Kartasura troops assigned to ambush them were led by Arya Mataram, Pakubuwono I's own younger brother. Arya Mataram successfully persuaded Amangkurat III to evacuate to the east, when he himself joined with Pakubuwono I.

The throne of Kartasura thus fell to Pakubuwono I's hand, exactly on 17 September 1705.

Rule 
The rule of Pakubuwono I was brought up to a new treaty with Dutch East India Company as replacement ever signed by Amangkurat II. The old treaty stipulated that Kartasura was obliged to pay Trunajaya war cost in the amount of 4.5 million guilder, and the new one stipulated that Kartasura was obliged to send 13,000 ton rice per year for 25 years.

In 1706, joined Kartasura and Dutch troops run after Amangkurat III who sought for protection in Pasuruan. In a battle in Bangil, Untung Suropati, the then Regent of Pasuruan, was killed in action. Amangkurat III himself surrendered in Surabaya in 1708, and later exiled to Dutch Ceylon (now Sri Lanka).

One year later, Pakubuwono II was forced to sentence Duke Jangrana II of Surabaya, who previously helped him to ascend the throne, to death, on the ground that Dutch East India Company found proofs that Duke Jangrana II committed treason in First Javanese War of Succession in 1706.

Jangrana II was succeeded by his brother, Jayapuspita, as Regent of Surabaya. In 1714, Jayapuspita refused to appear before Pakubuwono I and prepared for rebellion. 3 years later, joined Kartasura and Dutch troops invaded Surabaya. According to Babad Tanah Jawi, this newly battle is more horrible than in Pasuruan. Jayapuspita was eventually defeated and retreated to Japan (now Mojokerto) in 1718.

Later life 
Sunan Pakubuwono I died in 1719, and was succeeded by his son, Amangkurat IV, whose reign was marked by Second Javanese War of Succession.

Children
 Gusti Pangeran Haryo Pamot 
 Tumenggung Honggowongso alias Joko Sangrib (Kentol Surawijaya), later Arungbinang I, Regent of Surakarta
 Pangeran Adipati Purbaya alias Gusti Panembahan Purbaya (RM. Sasangka), died 11 November 1726.
 GPH. Prangwedono alias RM. Ontowiro (RM. Kawa)
 Gusti Bendoro Raden Ayu Mataun, married with Kanjeng Raden Tumenggung Mataun
 Gusti Kanjeng Ratu Timur 
 Bendoro Raden Ayu Ronggo Prawirodirjo, married with Ronggo Prawirodirjo I, Regent of Madiun (1755–1784)
 Gusti Pangeran Haryo Adipati Diponegoro Madiun alias RM. Papak (Panembahan Herucokro Senopati Panatagama), died in 1720
 Gusti Bendoro Pangeran Haryo Blitar alias Sultan Ibnu Mustafa Paku Buwana (RM. Sudhomo), maternal grandfather of Arya Mangkunegara (father of Mangkunegara I), died September 1721
 RM. Sengkuk
 RM. Suryaputra (later Amangkurat IV/Mangkurat Jawi/Prabu Mangkurat Jawa), died 20 April 1726
 Prince Diposonto alias Ki Ageng Notokusumo alias Raden Martataruna (RM. Mesir), died 1719
 Gusti Raden Mas Suryokusumo alias Gusti Pangeran Haryo Ngabehi Salor ing Pasar (RM. Sudhiro), died in 1737
 Raden Ayu Lembah, married with RM. Sutikna (future Amangkurat III), later divorced and executed by the order of her own ex-husband.
 RAy. Himpun, married with RM. Sutikna after the death of RAy. Lembah, later divorced.

References
 Miksic, John N. (general ed.), et al. (2006)  Karaton Surakarta: A Look into the Court of Surakarta Hadiningrat, Central Java (First published: 'By the will of His Serene Highness Paku Buwono XII'. Surakarta: Yayasan Pawiyatan Kabudayan Karaton Surakarta, 2004). Marshall Cavendish Editions  Singapore  
 Babad Tanah Jawi, Mulai dari Nabi Adam Sampai Tahun 1647. (transl.). 2007. Yogyakarta: Narasi
 De Graaf HJ, Pigeaud Th. 1974. De eerste moslimse vorstendommen op Java: Studiën over de staatkundige geschiedenis van de 15de en 16de eeuw. Den Haag: Martinus Nijhoff
 De Graaf HJ. 1935. De moord op Kapitein François Tack, 8 februari 1686. Amsterdam: Paris.
 Ricklefs MC. 2001. A History of Modern Indonesia: 3rd Edition. Palgrave and Stanford University Press.
 Moedjianto. 1987. Konsep Kekuasaan Jawa: Penerapannya oleh Raja-raja Mataram. Yogyakarta: Kanisius.
 Purwadi. 2007. Sejarah Raja-Raja Jawa''. Yogyakarta: Media Ilmu.

External links
 Brief biography of Pakubuwana I (in Indonesian)

Sultans of Mataram
Burials at Imogiri
1648 births
1719 deaths
17th-century Indonesian people
18th-century Indonesian people
Indonesian royalty